Collection is the first greatest hits album by Canadian folk music group The Rankin Family. It was released by EMI in 1996. The album peaked at number 1 on the RPM Country Albums chart.

Track listing
"Roving Gypsy Boy Remix" (Jimmy Rankin) – 4:05
"Borders and Time" (J. Rankin) – 3:23
"Down by the Sally Gardens" (Traditional, William Butler Yeats) – 5:15
"Christy Campbell Medley" (Traditional) – 4:37
"Orangedale Whistle" (J. Rankin) – 3:25
"Rise Again" (Leon Dubinsky) – 3:47
"You Feel the Same Way Too" (J. Rankin) – 4:50
"Grey Dusk of Eve (Portobello)" (David Field, Rankin Family, Traditional) – 3:07
"North Country" (J. Rankin) – 3:35
"Fail Il" (Traditional) – 2:37
"Gillis Mountain" (Raylene Rankin) – 3:04
"Fare Thee Well Love" (J. Rankin) – 4:29
"Mull River Shuffle" (J. Rankin) – 7:50

Chart performance

References

1996 compilation albums
The Rankin Family albums
EMI Records compilation albums